Regional Command, formerly Support Command, is a two-star command of the British Army. It is the Army's HQ for the UK, Nepal and Brunei. It delivers Real Life Support to the Army and controls the UK Stations and Garrisons. It is also responsible for engagement with the civilian community and acts as the proponent for UK Operations.

Support Command, formed in 2011, became Regional Command in 2015.

History
Support Command was formed on 1 November 2011 and absorbed the functions of the 4th Infantry Division on 1 January 2012 and of 2nd Infantry Division and 5th Infantry Division from 1 April 2012. Support Command is headquartered at Aldershot Garrison in South East England. Initial published tasks included:
Lead on the Firm Base Concept for Commander Land Forces from 1 November 2011.
Deliver Firm Base support as defined by Project AVANTI from 3 January 2012 within 2nd (South East) Brigade, 43rd (Wessex) Brigade and 145 (South) Brigade boundaries and for the remainder within boundaries from 3 April 2012.
Assume command of British Gurkhas Nepal and British Forces Brunei from 3 January 2012.
Provide the Land Forces link to the Reserve Forces and Cadets Associations (RFCA) in order to ensure its outputs match the LF requirement. In order to provide land military capability in the most effective and efficient manner.

On 1 September 2015 Support Command was renamed Regional Command. The main duties of GOC Regional Command is to:

Provide the necessary support to the successful delivery of both UK and overseas operations
Achieve the specified tasks in support of the achievement of Firm Base Outputs
Deliver the Firm base, championing overseas support, whilst managing the drawdown in Germany
Support the sustainment of the Army's Moral Component in order to deliver success on operations, at home, and thereafter the Army of the future.

Components
As of 2013, the command had administrative control of the following units:

 2 (South East) Brigade
 15 (North East) Brigade
 38 (Irish) Brigade
 42 (North West) Brigade
 43 (Wessex) Brigade
 49 (East) Brigade
 51 (Scottish) Brigade
 143 (West Midlands) Brigade
 145 (South) Brigade
 160 (Welsh) Brigade
 British Forces Brunei
 British Gurkhas Nepal
 Aldershot Garrison
 Colchester Garrison
 Catterick Garrison

Under the Army 2020 reorganisation programme, the command began assisting 1st (UK) Division in managing the seven infantry brigades in the Adaptable Force. In late 2014 / early 2015, 2nd, 15th, 43rd, 49th, 143rd and 145th Brigades merged with the other brigades, leaving seven brigades in the Adaptable Force and two other Regional Points of Command in Force Troops Command. The command remains based at Aldershot and, from Spring 2015, had operational control of the nine Regional Points of Command which are:
Headquarters North East
Headquarters East
Headquarters South East
Headquarters North West
Headquarters Scotland
Headquarters West Midlands
Headquarters South West
38th (Irish) Brigade
160th (Welsh) Brigade

Commanders
Commanders include:
January 2012 - August 2013 Major-General Colin Boag
August 2013 - June 2015 Major-General Robert Nitsch
June 2015 - June 2017 Major-General Richard Stanford
June 2017 - February 2020 Major-General Duncan Capps
February 2020 - July 2022 Major-General David Eastman
July 2022 – present Major-General Jonathan Swift

References

External links
 Main Website

Commands of the British Army
Military units and formations established in 2015